CCNS may refer to:

Cloud condensation nuclei
Cape Cod National Seashore
A Cell Cycle Non-Specific drug. A medication used during chemotherapy (example: anthracycline antibiotics).